PA31 or PA-31 may refer to:

Pennsylvania's 31st congressional district
Pennsylvania Route 31
Piper PA-31 Navajo light aircraft